Enallagma vernale, the vernal bluet, is a species of narrow-winged damselfly in the family Coenagrionidae. It is found in North America.

The IUCN conservation status of Enallagma vernale is "LC", least concern, with no immediate threat to the species' survival. The population is stable.

References

Further reading

 
 

Coenagrionidae
Insects described in 1943